Neikuppai is a village in the Thiruvidaimarudur taluk of Thanjavur district, India.  It is located at a distance of 25 km from Kumbakonam on the road to Pandalur.  The Sundareswarar Temple is located here.

Population 

According to the 2001 census, the village had a population of 2,062 with 1,053 men and 1,009 women in 479 households.  The sex ratio was 958. The literacy rate was 74.

References 

 Website of 2001 census

Villages in Thanjavur district